Zoghal Chal may refer to:
 Zoghal Chal, Sari